Jeremiah Dencke was born October 2, 1725, in Langenbielau, Silesia and died May 28, 1795, in Bethlehem, Pennsylvania. He emigrated to the American colonies in 1761. Jeremiah Dencke was a Moravian and one of the first American composers.

List of works
 Meine Seele erhebet dem Herrn
 Gehet in dem Geruch Seines Brautigams-Namens
 Gesegnet bist du, sein Volk 
 Meine Herz dichtet ein feines Lied

Discography
 Flowering Of Vocal Music In America 1767-1823
 Lost Music Of Early America - The Moravians 
 Music from 18th-Century Pennsylvania (1976)
 Christmas in Early America (1994)
 Giuseppe Martucci (1995)
 America Sings, Volume I: The Founding Years (1995)

References

1725 births
1795 deaths
18th-century American composers
18th-century male musicians
18th-century musicians
American male composers
American composers
German emigrants to the Thirteen Colonies
Moravian Church
People from Austrian Silesia
People from Bielawa